Radical surgery, also called radical dissection, is surgery that is more extensive than "conservative" surgery. 

In surgical oncology, radical surgery is surgery intended to remove both a tumor and any metastases thereof, for diagnostic and/or treatment purposes. It typically describes the removal of a tumor or mass and ancillary lymph nodes that may drain the mass, as in radical mastectomy. It is opposed to for example palliative surgery which is intended for symptom relief rather than complete removal of cancer tissue.

In histopathology, radicality of tumor excisions is generally defined as the absence of tumor cells in a certain resection margin, with the specific margin width varying by tumor type and local guidelines. A non-radical excision may require re-excision.

References

Surgery